Koncertówka 2. Drugi szczyt – Pidzama Porno's second bootleg and their ninth album in their whole career. It was released on 10 June 2003. This album contains tracks from XIV birthday concert in Poznań (tracks 3,4,5,7), track no 2 comes from the concert in Proxima, from December 2000. The rest of the tracks (except track no 1 - a sample from a movie called "Wodzirej") come from XIII birthday in Gwint in Białystok.

Track listing

The band

Krzysztof "Grabaż" Grabowski – vocal 
Andrzej "Kozak" Kozakiewicz – guitar
Sławek "Dziadek" Mizerkiewicz – guitar
Julian "Julo" Piotrowiak – bass guitar
Rafał "Kuzyn" Piotrowiak – drums

Guests:
Kasia Nosowska 
Marcin Świetlicki 
Robert Matera 
Łoś 
Semen

Pidżama Porno albums
2003 live albums